Rusa is a genus of deer from southern Asia. They have traditionally been included in Cervus, and genetic evidence suggests this may be more appropriate than their present placement in a separate genus.

Three of the four species have relatively small distributions in the Philippines and Indonesia, but the sambar is more widespread, ranging from India east and north to China and south to the Greater Sundas. All are threatened by habitat loss and hunting in their native ranges, but three of the species have also been introduced elsewhere.

Species

References

 
Cervines
Mammal genera
Taxa named by Charles Hamilton Smith